Swingin'  is the second studio album by the American singer Dino. It was released in 1990 by Island Records. The album reached No. 82 on the Billboard 200. 

The album contains two singles, "Romeo", which reached No. 6 on the Billboard Hot 100 singles chart, and "Gentle", which reached No. 31. The former features rapper Doctor Ice.

Production
Dino produced the album, and wrote nine of the songs.

Critical reception
The Chicago Tribune wrote that "in years to come, Dino may prove to be more durable as a behind-the-scenes force ... but there are enough sizzling songs here to keep his name in front of dance-pop listeners for months."

Track listing

Charts

References

1990 albums
Dino (singer) albums